First Lady of Haiti or First Gentleman of Haiti is the title attributed to the spouse of the president of Haiti.

The current acting first lady of Haiti is Annie Claude Massiau, wife of Acting President Ariel Henry, who has held the position since July 20, 2021.

Spouses

References

External links
 First Lady of Haiti official government page  (French)

 
Haiti